Kitty Kornered is a 1946 Warner Bros. Looney Tunes cartoon, directed by Robert Clampett. The short was released on June 8, 1946, and stars Porky Pig and Sylvester.

Porky and Sylvester would later be paired in a trio of shorts directed by Chuck Jones: Scaredy Cat, Claws for Alarm, and Jumpin' Jupiter. Both also appeared (with Daffy Duck) in The Scarlet Pumpernickel as a villain (the only time Sylvester spoke in a Chuck Jones-directed cartoon).

Plot

The neighborhood's cat owners all (literally) throw their cats out for the night. Porky Pig attempts to do the same, but his four cats (a tall black and white lisping cat (Sylvester), a medium-sized tabby, a diminutive kitten, and a dumb drunkard cat) attempt to turn the tables and throw him out into the snow. Porky states that he is starting to hate pussycats. Porky bangs on the door, demanding to be let in, but the cats pop out of the door and proclaim in unison, "Milkman, keep those bottles quiet!", and then slam the door in his face which soon leads to a battle between Porky and his cats for the house.

While the cats are lounging around, a furious Porky bursts through the window, making an incredibly menacing face. He chases them around the house until one of them throws him into a cabinet full of dishes and a teapot. Porky retaliates by setting his pet dog "Lassie" on the cats. The cats see the dog's shadow and run for their lives, not knowing that "Lassie" is in reality only a shadow puppet created with Porky's fingers.

When Sylvester finds out that they have been tricked, he and the others plot revenge, which is exacted by having the cats create a War of the Worlds-esque sensation about invading aliens, disguising themselves as the aliens and driving Porky into a panic over "Men from Mars!"  Porky gets frightened and tries to shoot them with a gun but the cats, now dressed like Teddy Roosevelt, charge at Porky with swords and run him out of the house once and for all and winning the battle. Homeless, alone, and cold in the snow, Porky turns to the camera and asks the audience if they have a vacancy for a house.

Reception
Comics historian Craig Yoe writes, "In this uproariously funny film written by director Robert Clampett himself, everything and everyone is made of rubber. The last half has some of the most exhilirating action ever put on film."

Cultural references
"Milkman, Keep Those Bottles Quiet" was a World War II hit song by Ella Mae Morse, and was sung by Nancy Walker in the film Broadway Rhythm.

The wine that the grey drunken cat was drinking says "Arsenic and Old Grapes" is a parody reference to Arsenic and Old Lace.

On The Sylvester & Tweety Mysteries, the "Men from Mars" characters made an appearance in "Spaced Out."

The cats charging at Porky assume the appearances of Theodore Roosevelt and his Rough Riders cavalry (in reference to the then-popular film Arsenic and Old Lace).

References

External links
 
 
 

1946 animated films
1946 short films
1946 films
Films directed by Bob Clampett
Looney Tunes shorts
Warner Bros. Cartoons animated short films
1940s science fiction films
Porky Pig films
Sylvester the Cat films
Films about pets
Animated films about extraterrestrial life
Films scored by Carl Stalling
American animated science fiction films
1940s Warner Bros. animated short films
Alien invasions in films
Cultural depictions of Theodore Roosevelt